Loch Beag is a cove on the west coast of Northern Scotland, in the vicinity of the Sound of Arisaig. The eastern end of the Sound of Arisaig divides into Loch nan Uamh in the north and Loch Ailort in the south separated by a headland. Loch Beag is an inlet at the eastern end of Loch nan Uamh.

The area is extremely thinly populated, but the loch is used for a mussel fishery. Many eider ducks also live around this cove.

Etymology
Beag is Scottish Gaelic for "small" and is the name of several small lochs around Scotland.  Loch is cognate with English "lake", but in Scottish Gaelic is also applied to coastal sea inlets.

References

Coves of the United Kingdom
Geography of Scotland